Daniel Quesada Barrera (born 26 September 1995 in Spain) is a Spanish taekwondo competitor. He won the gold medal in the men's lightweight event at the 2022 World Taekwondo Championships held in Guadalajara, Mexico. He won a bronze medal at the 2019 World Taekwondo Championships.

He won the silver medal in the men's 80 kg event at the 2022 Mediterranean Games held in Oran, Algeria.

References

Spanish male taekwondo practitioners
1995 births
Living people
World Taekwondo Championships medalists
Mediterranean Games silver medalists for Spain
Mediterranean Games medalists in taekwondo
Competitors at the 2022 Mediterranean Games
21st-century Spanish people